Pantone 448 C is a colour in the Pantone colour system. Described as a drab dark brown and informally dubbed the "ugliest colour in the world", it was selected in 2012 as the colour for plain tobacco and cigarette packaging in Australia, after market researchers determined that it was the least attractive colour.

The Australian Department of Health initially referred to the colour as "olive green", but the name was changed after concerns were expressed by the Australian Olive Association.

Since 2016, the same colour has also been used for plain cigarette packaging in many countries, including France, the United Kingdom, Ireland, Israel, Norway, New Zealand, Slovenia, Saudi Arabia, Uruguay, Thailand, Singapore, Turkey, Belgium, and the Netherlands.

The colour has also been widely but erroneously reported as being known as "opaque couché"; in fact this is simply French for "layered opaque", in reference to being used on coated paper. The confusion may have arisen because "Pantone opaque couché" is the French name of a swatch library (palette) used in Adobe Illustrator containing this colour and intended for printing in solid ink colours on coated paper; in English this library is known as "Pantone solid coated".

References

External links 
 http://www.pantone.com/color-finder/448-C

Shades of brown
Tobacco control